Chaetomium grande is a fungus species in the Chaetomium genus, first isolated from Iran. It shares features such as peridium structure, ascospore morphology and germ pore position with its cogenerates. It is closely related to C. megalocarpum.

References

Further reading

External links

MycoBank

grande